Eungbongsan is a mountain that sits on the border Samcheok, Gangwon-do and Uljin County, Gyeongsangbuk-do, in South Korea.

See also
List of mountains in Korea

Notes

References

Mountains of Gangwon Province, South Korea
Samcheok
Mountains of North Gyeongsang Province
Uljin County
Mountains of South Korea